William Tevlin Arthur (16 April 1918 – 28 February 1982) was an Australian politician. Born in Sydney, he attended state schools and was on military service from 1941 to 1946. Subsequently he was a journalist, scriptwriter and research officer. He first contested the Australian House of Representatives seat of Barton in 1954, but was unsuccessful. However, in 1966 he defeated Labor member Len Reynolds and was elected for the Liberal Party. He held the seat until 1969 when he was defeated by Reynolds, whereupon he became a consultant. He died in 1982.

References

1918 births
1982 deaths
Liberal Party of Australia members of the Parliament of Australia
Members of the Australian House of Representatives for Barton
Members of the Australian House of Representatives
Australian Army personnel of World War II
20th-century Australian politicians
Australian Army officers